Faristenia mukurossivora is a moth in the family Gelechiidae. It is found in Japan (Honshu).

The length of the forewings is 6.2-6.8 mm for males and 6.5-7.4 mm for females. The forewings are dark brownish grey with dense whitish grey irroration and with scattered blackish scales. There are five fuscous marks on the costa, a large, obscure fuscous mark on the cell and blackish small dots near the apex. The hindwings are pale brownish grey, scattered with ochreous.

The larvae feed on Sapindus mukurossi.

References

Faristenia
Moths described in 2000